Bruit Island is an island in Daro District, Mukah Division, Sarawak, Malaysia. It is located in the Rejang Delta, 150 km northwest of Kuching. With a population of around 9,342 and an area of 417 square kilometres, it is the second largest island in Malaysia after Banggi Island.

History
According to the book Sarawak and Its People, Bruit Island was inhabited before 1830.

Geography
Bruit Island lies within the Rejang Delta, with the South China Sea to the north and west, Sarikei to the south and Kuala Matu to the east. The island is separated from the other islands in the Rejang delta and the mainland by the mouth of Batang Paloh ("batang" means river in the local language) on the south and Muara Lassa ("muara" means mouth of river) on the east.

Currently, the island is connected to the surrounding mainland and towns by two ferry points; one at the southern end and the other on the eastern side. The southern ferry connects the island by road to Tanjung Manis, a seaport, and Sibu town. The eastern ferry point connects it to Daro town and to Mukah, the divisional administrative centre. Two bridges, Muara Lassa Bridge (2.43 kilometers length) and Batang Paloh Bridge (1.7 kilometers length), are currently on construction to connect the island with mainland Sarawak, which is slated for completion in 2023.

A number of fishing villages are located along the coast, especially on the western side, facing South China Sea and a few others along the rest of the island's coast. The villages are usually located at the mouth of small rivers on the island. The two main villages are Kampung Semop and Kg. Bruit ("kampung" or short form "Kg." means village). Currently, a lot of the villages are connected by branch roads joint to the main road traversing the island longitudinally.

Below is the list of population in Bruit Island by village (kampung):
Bruit - 1935
Tekajong - 1238
Penipah - 1081
Salah Kecil - 364
Penibong - 425
Penuai - 105
Kut - 182
Semop - 1967
Saai - 174
Sedi - 69
Sebako - 773
Betanak - 905
Rumah Juing, Sungai Kelai - 124

References

Daro District
Islands of Sarawak